Too Busy to Work is a 1939 American comedy film, directed by Otto Brower and starring Jed Prouty, Spring Byington, and Kenneth Howell. It was one of the Jones Family film series, based upon the play of the same name.

References

External links
Too Busy to Work at the Internet Movie Database

1939 films
American comedy films
1939 comedy films
Films directed by Otto Brower
American black-and-white films
20th Century Fox films
1930s American films